Rigshospitalet (meaning The National, State or Hospital of the Realm, but not usually translated) is the largest public and teaching hospital in Copenhagen and the most highly specialised hospital in Denmark. The hospital's main building is a 16-storey functionalist highrise, one of the tallest structures in the central parts of the city. Rigshospitalet neighbours the Panum Building which houses the Faculty of Health and Medical Sciences at the University of Copenhagen. As a teaching hospital it is part of the framework organisation Copenhagen University Hospital.

Name
The Danish name is not usually translated to English. The prefix Rigs- is used in the names of some Danish state institutions, especially in a solemn or prestigious context or for authorities serving for the whole Danish Realm including Greenland and the Faroe Islands. It is the genitive of rige ('realm, kingdom, empire') and the cognate word is used similarly in Norwegian, Swedish, Icelandic and Dutch (and in German until 1945). The prefix Stats- ('of the state') is more widely used, but implies a slightly lower level in the hierarchy. Although Rigshospitalet was founded as a state hospital, as opposed to the normal hospitals operated by counties, the Danish term Statshospital was until 1977 used only for psychiatric institutions.

The hospital itself explains the name was given because its predecessor, Royal Frederick's Hospital, was handed over to the state and became open to patients from the whole Danish Realm.

Rigshospitalet is often abbreviated RH and colloquially also called Riget (literally meaning 'the realm' or 'the kingdom'), hence the name of von Trier's thriller TV series The Kingdom which was set at the hospital, and Stephen King's American version Kingdom Hospital.

History
Rigshospitalet was founded on 30 March 1757 as Kongelig Frederiks Hospital, named after King Frederick V and situated in Bredgade in central Copenhagen. The buildings are now occupied by the Danish Museum of Art & Design. Since 1903 the state has been the owner of the hospital (whereas other hospitals in Denmark are owned by the regions, formerly by the counties). In 1910 the hospital was renamed and moved to its present location in ten low buildings surrounding a central garden designed by architect Martin Borch. In 1970 most of the buildings were replaced by the present highrise concrete building designed by architect Jørgen Stærmose, while some of the surrounding older buildings still serve hospital functions. In 1995 the hospital was handed over to Hovedstadens Sygehusfællesskab (HS, The Capital Hospital Trust) which in 2007 was absorbed by the Capital Region. In 2007 a helipad was built on top of the hospital. Until then, rescue helicopters and helicopters transferring patients would land in the neighbouring park Fælledparken.

In 2021 Rigshospitalet was ranked as the worlds 15th best hospital by Statista and Newsweek.

Key figures 
As of 2021, some key figures at Rigshospitalet are:

Services
Rigshospitalet's mission is to be Denmark's leading hospital for patients needing highly specialized treatment. Its main specialist role has been enhanced in recent years by the decision that it should serve as the host institution for many of Copenhagen's speciality departments. Because of this, other hospitals refer patients to Rigshospitalet for the unique expertise available there.

Rigshospitalet's neighbor, the Panum Building, houses the University of Copenhagen's Faculty of Health and Medical Sciences. This proximity optimizes a close cooperation between the two in the fields of research and development. The Nordic Cochrane Centre and the University Centre for Nursing and Care Research are in Rigshospitalet.

With 1,120 beds, Rigshospitalet has responsibility for 65,000 inpatients and approximately 420,000 outpatients annually. In addition to its 8,000 personnel (7,000 full-time equivalents), the hospital trains, hosts, and has the in-service advantages of students of medicine and other health care sciences, as well as scientists working within Rigshospitalet under a variety of research grants.
 
Rigshospitalet has a trauma centre specialised at receiving severely injured patients. Ordinary emergency department treatment has been relegated to the other hospitals in Copenhagen.

Social and cultural significance
The hospital is the location of Lars von Trier's three-season television horror mini-series The Kingdom.

Queen Margrethe II's children, Crown Prince Frederik and Prince Joachim, were both born at Rigshospitalet (though the Queen had intended to give birth to her firstborn at Amalienborg Palace but had to be transferred to Rigshospitalet where Frederik was delivered by emergency C-section). Likewise, Frederik's four children, Christian, Isabella, Vincent and Josephine, and Joachim's four children, Nikolai, Felix, Henrik and Athena, were all born there.

Blood contamination 
Two patients were infected with HIV at Rigshospitalet in February 2007 after getting a blood transfusion with infected blood. The blood had been tested for antibodies, where HIV infections in the very earliest phase potentially can be overlooked. The contagion could, according to experts, probably have been discovered if the blood had been tested with the newer nucleic acid test, which since 2009 is a requirement..

Images

See also 
Aarhus University Hospital – the largest hospital in Denmark
Rikshospitalet – a hospital in Norway with a similar function and name

References

External links 

 
 Website of Copenhagens University Hospital, (in Danish only)
 Faculty of Health Sciences website

Hospitals in Copenhagen
1757 establishments in Denmark
Hospitals established in the 1750s
Skyscrapers in Denmark